Hieracium triste, commonly known as woolly hawkweed, is a species of flowering plant. It is native to North America where it is widespread across western Canada and the western United States from Alaska, Yukon, and the Northwest Territories south as far as California and New Mexico.

Description
Hieracium triste is a perennial herb. It produces a milky latex that often is described erroneously as sap. The stem has long hairs and some hairs that look like stars.

Leaves
Hieracium triste has basal leaves that are often in a rosette. Most leaves are either hairless or have short hairs.

Flowers
Each plant usually only contains one to two flowers. They are yellow and often look like dandelions. They have bracts around each flower that have grey star shaped hairs and long black gland tipped hairs. These flowers bloom from June to August.

Habitat
Slender hawkweed grows in moist to wet open sites. It grows in mid-montane to alpine areas. It is most commonly seen below the timberline in areas with whitebark pine and alpine larch. It likes dry sites at lower elevations from Southern Colorado to Wyoming.

References

External links

United States Department of Agriculture Plants Profile, Hieracium triste

Flora of North America
Plants described in 1826
tristis